The United Dominica Labour Party (UDLP) was a political party in Dominica.

History
The party was formed as a split from the Dominica Labour Party. It contested the 1985 general elections, receiving 1.7% of the vote and winning one seat, with Rosie Douglas elected in Paix Bouche. Later in the same year it merged back into Dominica Labour Party (DLP), with UDLP leader Michael Douglas becoming DLP leader the following year.

References

Defunct political parties in Dominica